C'mon Baby or Come On Baby may refer to:

Music
Come on Baby EP, by Tokyo Dragons 2006

Songs
"Come On Baby", song by Joe Satriani from Professor Satchafunkilus and the Musterion of Rock
Come On Baby (Moby song)
Come On Baby (Saigon song)
"Come On Baby (Let's Do the Revolution)", song by Chumbawamba from Never Mind the Ballots
"Come On Baby", single by Tokyo Dragons 2006 from Give Me the Fear
"Come On Baby", song by The Breakaways,	F. O'Connor 1978
"Come On Baby", song by Bruce Channel, Channel	1962
"Come On Baby", song by The Eagles (UK band)	1963
"Come On Baby", song by The Grumbleweeds,	Maurice Lee 1981
"Come On Baby", song by  Jimmy Smith (musician), Burrell	1960
"Come On Baby", song by  Jo-Ann Campbell,	Jo-Ann Campbell 1957
"Come On Baby", song by Leon Bass,	 Leon Bass 1960
"Come On Baby", song by  Lightning Hopkins,	Hopkins 1965
"Come On Baby", song by Lord Creator, Kentrick Patrick 1963 
"Come On Baby", song by Ottilie Patterson With Chris Barber's Jazz Band,  Ottilie Patterson	1962
"Come On Baby", song by Owen Gray With Sonny Bradshaw Quartet, Gray 	1962
"Come On Baby", song by Pliers (singer) W. Riley 
"Come On Baby", song by Ramsey Lewis Trio, Holt & Lewis	 1963
"Come On Baby", song by The Rockin' Chairs, R. Bachstetter, L. Yellin 1958
"Come On Baby", song by Roulettes,  	Galanti   	1958
"Come On Baby", single by Willie Mabon, Mabon	1955
"Come On Baby", song by Mickey Gilley, M. Gilley 1973	
"C'mon Baby", song by Buddy Knox and The Rhythm Orchids 1958
"C'mon Baby", song by Chilly (band)	1978
"C'mon Baby", song by Tricky (musician)	2009
Come On Baby Papa Winnie 1991